The 1960 South Australian National Football League season was the 81st season of the top-level Australian rules football competition in South Australia.

North Adelaide won the 1960 Grand Final, defeating Norwood by 5 points.

Ladder

Finals Series

Grand Final

References 

SANFL
South Australian National Football League seasons